Motordrome Speedway was a 1/2-mile NASCAR sanctioned racetrack located in South Huntingdon Township, Westmoreland County, to the northeast of Smithton, Pennsylvania, United States.

Weekly series divisions that ran included super late models, modifieds, street stocks, chargers and super compacts.  The track operated Friday nights weekly from April to October until closing its doors in 2015. As of March 2016 the track was closed and for sale or lease.

The track and buildings are all still on the property, though have become looted and vandalized as often happens with "abandoned" properties with little or no security 

The original Motordrome was in nearby Ruffs Dale. East Huntingdon Township. It was a dirt track. Pits were on one side of the track and stands on the other.

Late Model Points Champions
1990 Steve Peles
1991 Glenn Gault
1992 Charlie Cragan
1993 Charlie Cragan
1994 Charlie Cragan
1995 Mark Cottone
1996 Jeff Dunmyer
1997 Jeff Dunmyer
1998 Jeff Dunmyer
1999 Richard Mitchell
2000 Richard Mitchell
2001 Mark Cottone
2002 Garry Wiltrout
2003 Rick Miller
2004 Rick Miller
2005 Rick Miller
2006 Richard Mitchell
2007 Richard Mitchell
2008 Richard Mitchell
2009 Mark Cottone
2010 Mark Cottone
2011 Barry Awtey
2012 Neil Brown
2013 Garry Wiltrout
2014 Bobby Henry
2015 Garry Wiltrout

NASCAR Northeast Region Champions
 Charlie Cragan: 1992, 1993, 1994
 Jeff Dunmyer: 1997
 Richard Mitchell: 1999, 2000

NASCAR K&N Pro Series East winner
2015 Dillon Bassett

CARS Hooters Pro Cup Series winners
2002 Jay Fogleman
2003 Kertus Davis

References

External links

 
Motordrome Speedway archive at Racing-Reference

Motorsport venues in Pennsylvania
Buildings and structures in Westmoreland County, Pennsylvania
Tourist attractions in Westmoreland County, Pennsylvania
NASCAR tracks